Alexandra Lamy (born 14 October 1971) is a French actress.

Early life
Lamy was born in Villecresnes, near Paris, but grew up in Languedoc-Roussillon. When she was six months old, her parents, Michel and Michèle, moved the family to La Grande-Motte in Southern France. A few years later, her family moved again to Alès, where her father ran a fabric shop. She fell in love with theatre while performing in school plays. She later moved to Paris to begin her career, where she worked to lose her southern French accent.

Her sister, Audrey Lamy, is also an actress and currently stars in the French sitcom Scènes de ménage. Their cousin is the politician François Lamy.

Career

From 1999 to 2003, she starred in Un gars, une fille.

 TV commercial for Eurofil
 TV commercial for Lustucru (2004)
 Play "Théorbe" (Christian Siméon, 2005)
 Play "Cinglée" (Tom Topor) (1988)
 Play "La poule aux yeux d'or" (1994)
 (January 20, 2006 - June 17, 2006) Stage play "Deux sur la balançoire (Two for the Seesaw)" by William Gibson, French adaptation by Jean-Loup Dabadie, Directed by Bernard Murat, co-starring with Jean Dujardin at Théâtre Edouard VII, Paris, France.
 (January 10, 2013 - February 16, 2013) One woman play "La Vénus au phacochère" by Christian Siméon, Directed by Christophe Lidon, Costumes by Ralph Lauren, at Théâtre de l'Atelier, Paris, Paris
 (June 6, 2013 - July 6, 2013) One woman play "La Vénus au phacochère" by Christian Siméon at Théâtre de l'Atelier, Paris, Paris (reprise)

Magazine Covers (3)

Personal life
Lamy started dating her Un gars, une fille  costar Jean Dujardin in 2003. They married in 2009, and divorced in 2013.

She was previously in a relationship with actor Thomas Jouannet from 1995 to 2003, with whom she had a daughter, Chloé, born in October 1997.

Theater

Filmography

Dubbing

See also
 Thomas Jouannet

References

External links

 

1971 births
Living people
French film actresses
French television actresses
20th-century French actresses
21st-century French actresses
Knights of the Ordre national du Mérite
People from Villecresnes
Cours Florent alumni